Nandi Awards for the year 2015 announced by Andhra Pradesh Government on 14 November 2017 The S. S. Rajamouli starrer Baahubali: The Beginning emerged as a big winner by a record winning of 13 awards for the year.  The NTR National award for the year was conferred upon director K. Raghavendra Rao.

The Awards Ceremony would be held in Amaravati.

Winners list

Controversy

Director Ram Gopal Varma and Gunasekhar criticised that the selection of awards are biased, the Rudhramadevi (film), which is about women empowerment was not considered as best films.

See also
Nandi Awards of 2013

References

2015
2015 Indian film awards
Lists of Indian award winners